The Very Best of Elkie Brooks  is a compilation album by Elkie Brooks, compiled and released in 1986. It was issued on CD, vinyl and cassette through A&M Records in the Granada TV region only.

The Very Best of Elkie Brooks was not chart eligible.

Track listing 
 Nights in White Satin
 Don’t Cry Out Loud
 Blue Moon
 Gasoline Alley
 Sunshine After The Rain
 Ain't Misbehavin'
 Fool If You Think It's Over
 Minutes
 Pearl's a Singer
 Goin' Back
 If You Leave Me Now
 Only Love Can Break Your Heart
 I Guess That’s Why They Call It The Blues
 Growing Tired
 Will You Write Me A Song
 Lilac Wine
Cassette bonus tracks:
 Gloria
 The Rose

Elkie Brooks albums
1986 compilation albums
A&M Records compilation albums